La Voce may refer to:
 La Voce (album), by British tenor Russell Watson
 La Voce (magazine), an Italian literary magazine
 La Voce (newspaper), an Italian daily newspaper
 "La voce" (song), by Italian singer Laura Pausini

See also 
 Voce (disambiguation)